"Magnetic Eyes" is a song by London-based drum and bass producers and DJs Matrix & Futurebound, featuring vocals from Baby Blue. The song was released in the United Kingdom on 30 December 2012 for digital download. The song peaked at number 24 on the UK Singles Chart. The song stayed inside the top 40 for six weeks.

Music video
A music video to accompany the release of "Magnetic Eyes" was first released onto YouTube on 4 November 2012 at a total length of three minutes and forty-one seconds. It features Baby Blue fading in and out of focus to reveal images of a wolf.

Track listings

Chart performance

Release history

References

2012 singles
Matrix & Futurebound songs
2012 songs
Songs written by Tom Cane